Shandong Hi-Speed Kirin is a Chinese professional basketball team based in Jinan, Shandong, which plays in the Northern Division of the Chinese Basketball Association (CBA). Some home games are held in the nearby city of Linyi.

The Hi-Speed Group is the club's corporate sponsor. The long-time previous corporate sponsor was Kingston.

History
In its early years, the team was known as the Shandong Flaming Bulls (Chinese: 山东火牛), but became the Shandong Lions at the start of the 2003–04 CBA season. At the same time the club moved its homecourt from Jinan to Yantai (six games) and Dongying (five games). For the 2004–05 CBA season, they relocated to Tai'an, but have been back in Jinan since the 2005–06 CBA season.

During the 2004–05 CBA season, the freshly-rebranded Shandong Gold Lions finished in sixth place in the CBA North Division, and out of the playoffs. In the 2005–06 season, the team finished fifth, yet again out of the playoffs.

The club's most successful campaign so far has been the 2012–13 CBA season, when it advanced to the CBA Finals, but got swept in the best-of-seven championship series in just four games by the Guangdong Southern Tigers.

Players

Current roster

External links 
 Club official website 
 Team profile at Sports.Sina.com.cn 

 
Chinese Basketball Association teams
Sport in Shandong
Basketball teams established in 1995
1995 establishments in China